Elachista littoricola is a moth of the family Elachistidae. It is found in Great Britain, France, Germany, Denmark, the Czech Republic, Italy, Latvia, Estonia, Finland and Russia.

The wingspan is about 7–8 mm.

The larvae feed on couch grass (Elytrigia repens) mining the leaves of their host plant.

References

littoricola
Leaf miners
Moths described in 1938
Moths of Europe